These are the list of awards and nominations received by K.Will, a South Korean singer.

Awards and nominations

Melon Music Awards

Mnet Asian Music Awards (MAMA)

Republic of Korea Entertainment Arts Awards

Golden Disk Awards

Cyworld Digital Music Awards

Seoul Music Awards

Gaon Chart K-Pop Awards

SBS MTV Best of the Best

World Music Awards

Other awards

Notes

References 

K.Will